Maurizio Mannelli (January 1, 1930 – May 22, 2014) was an Italian water polo player who competed in the 1952 Summer Olympics.

He was born in Rome.

In 1952 he was part of the Italian team which won the bronze medal in the Olympic tournament. He played all eight matches.

See also
 List of Olympic medalists in water polo (men)

References

External links
 

1930 births
2014 deaths
Italian male water polo players
Water polo players at the 1952 Summer Olympics
Olympic bronze medalists for Italy in water polo
Medalists at the 1952 Summer Olympics
Water polo players from Rome